CS Femina-Sport Chișinău is a Moldovan sports society in Chișinău, Moldova. The club was founded in 2011, and is the only exclusively female sports club in this region.
At the moment in club activates 7 sections: football, basketball, handball, volleyball, rugby league, tennis and bowling. In November 2012 the club was close to being dissolved due to financial problems.

Honours
Basketball
Moldovan championship (2): 2011-2012, 2012-2013
Moldovan Cup (2): 2011, 2012, 2013

Handball
Moldovan championship
Runners-up (2): 2011-2012, 2012-2013, 2013-2014
Winter Moldovan Cup (1): 2011-2012
Moldovan Cup
Runners-up (1): 2012

Rugby
„Liga Prutului” 
Winners (1): 2012

Beach Volleyball
Moldovan championship
Runners-up (1): 2012
Championship of Chișinău
Runners-up (1): 2012
„Victoria” Cup
 Winners (1): 2013

Volleyball 2x2
Moldovan championship
Third place (1): 2012
Moldovan Cup (1): 2012

References

External links 
 
 Official page at facebook
 Official channel at YouTube

Sports clubs established in 2011
Multi-sport clubs in Moldova
Sports clubs in Moldova
Women's sport in Moldova